Rajmund Michał Bergel (1894-1937) was a Polish poet, literary critic, playwright, and infantry captain  in the Polish Army.

References 

1894 births
1937 deaths
Polish Army officers
Recipients of the Silver Cross of the Virtuti Militari
20th-century Polish poets